Nid d'Aigle (French: Eagle's Nest) is the terminus of the Tramway du Mont Blanc (TMB) from Saint-Gervais-les-Bains on the slopes of the Mont Blanc.

This station welcomes mountaineers as well as hikers at 2,362 m altitude below the glacier of Bionnassay. During the winter months the tram only stops at the lower Bellevue station, because of the avalanche risks.

A trip by tram from Le Fayet to this terminus lasts about three quarters of an hour and the panorama is remarkable. Here starts the modern normal route on the French side to the summit of Mont Blanc via the Refuge de Tête Rousse and Goûter Refuge.

The tramway terminus is also the finish location of the mountain run Montée du Nid d’Aigle, yearly in the month of July since 1986.

The first building of the station dated from 1933 and was destroyed by a fire in 2002.

External links
 Tramway du Mont Blanc website

Tourist attractions in Haute-Savoie
Railway stations in Haute-Savoie
Mont Blanc
Transport in the Alps